Karin Nordgren (April 30, 1919 – January 20, 2001) was a Swedish film actress and stage actress. She was married to the actor Alf Kjellin from 1941 to 1954.

Selected filmography
 Emilie Högquist (1939)
 Nothing But the Truth (1939)
 Kiss Her! (1940)
 June Night (1940)
 One, But a Lion! (1940)
 Lärarinna på vift (1941)
 Bright Prospects (1941)
 Poor Ferdinand (1941)
 Dunungen (1941)
 En sjöman i frack (1942)

References

Bibliography
 Quirk, Lawrence J. The Films of Ingrid Bergman. Carol Publishing Group, 1975.

External links

1919 births
2001 deaths
Swedish film actresses
Swedish stage actresses
20th-century Swedish actresses